Encephalartos schmitzii (Schmitz's cycad) is a species of cycad in Africa.

Description
It is a cycad with a largely underground stem, no more than 30 cm high and with a diameter of about 20 cm. [2]

The leaves, pinnate, 40–60 cm long, are arranged in a crown at the apex of the stem and are supported by a short spiny petiole; each leaf is composed of numerous pairs of lanceolate leaflets, with whole or slightly toothed margins, on average 10-14 cm long, of glaucous green color, inserted on the rachis with an angle of 45-80°

It is a dioecious species with male specimens showing 1-3 cones, cylinder-ovoid, 8–10 cm long and 3–4 cm broad, of bluish-green color and female specimens with solitary ovoid cones, 20–25 cm long and with diameter of 10–12 cm.

The seeds are coarsely ovoid, 20–25 mm long, covered with an orange-red sarcotesta.

Range
Encephalartos schmitzii occurs in the Luapula River watershed, in Democratic Republic of the Congo (on the extreme south of the Kundelungu plateau, Shaba Province) and in Zambia (along the Muchinga escarpment in Luapula and Northern provinces). A subpopulation is also found in North-Western Province, Zambia, to the east of Solwezi.

References

External links

schmitzii